Arcenillas is a municipality located in the province of Zamora, Castile and León, Spain. According to the 2004 census (INE), the municipality has a population of 309 inhabitants.

A collection of 11 Hispano-Flemish-style panels of the 15th century painted by Fernando Gallego have made the village notable.

References

Municipalities of the Province of Zamora